Andorra competed at the 2004 Summer Olympics in Athens, Greece from 13 to 29 August 2004.

Athletics 

Andorran athletes have so far achieved qualifying standards in the following athletics events (up to a maximum of 3 athletes in each event at the 'A' Standard, and 1 at the 'B' Standard). 

Men

Women

Judo 

Andorra sent one competitor to the Olympic Games in Judo.

Shooting 

Andorra sent one competitor to the Olympic Games in shooting. 

Men

Swimming 

Andorra sent two competitors to the Olympic games in swimming.

Men

Women

References

External links
Official Report of the XXVIII Olympiad
Comitè Olímpic Andorrà 

Nations at the 2004 Summer Olympics
2004 Summer Olympics
2004 in Andorran sport